Arlindo Chinaglia (born 24 December 1949) is a Brazilian politician and former President of the Chamber of Deputies of Brazil 2007–2009. He represents the state of São Paulo in the National Congress of Brazil for the Workers' Party.

References

External links 
 Website

Presidents of the Chamber of Deputies (Brazil)
1949 births
People from São Paulo (state)
Living people
Workers' Party (Brazil) politicians
Members of the Chamber of Deputies (Brazil) from São Paulo
Members of the Legislative Assembly of São Paulo